Mompati Sebogodi Merafhe (6 June 1936 – 7 January 2015) was a Botswana politician who was Vice-President of Botswana from 2008 to 2012. He was a retired Lieutenant-General and served as Minister of Foreign Affairs from 1994 to 2008.

Biography
Merafhe was born on 6 June in Serowe in 1936. After receiving his secondary education at Moeng College, Merafhe joined the then Bechuanaland Protectorate Police Force in 1960 and gradually rose through the ranks. In 1971 he became the commander of the Police Mobile Unit, becoming the first citizen to occupy such a position. When Botswana formed the Botswana Defense Force (BDF) in 1977, Merafhe was selected by President Sir Seretse Khama as its first commander at the rank of Major-General. He was elevated to Lieutenant-General in 1986.

Merafhe was a widely-respected commander of the BDF, working closely with his second-in-command Ian Khama to develop its ability to police the borders, deter poaching of the country's wildlife resources, and to establish an air arm. Due to his success in building up the nascent BDF into an effective and well-respected force, President Quett Masire decided to entice him into politics in 1989. Masire viewed Merafhe as a potential successor, but the former general's continued involvement in factional party infighting meant that he was bypassed for the vice presidency in 1992.

Between 1995 and 2002, Merafhe served as a member of the Inter-Parliamentary Human Rights Network and the Commonwealth Ministerial Action Group (CMAG).

He was first elected to the Central Committee of the Botswana Democratic Party (BDP) in 1991 and remained on the body until ill-health forced his retirement in 2012. After being specially elected in 1989, Merafhe became the Member of Parliament for Mahalapye West in the 1994 election. He was elected for a third time in the October 2004 general election, receiving 5,429 votes against 1,664 for Abigail Mogalakwe of the Botswana National Front (BNF) and 975 for Thomas Ookeditse of the Botswana Congress Party  (BCP). Besides serving as Foreign Minister, he also served a period as Minister of Presidential Affairs and Public Administration.

When Ian Khama took office as President on 1 April 2008, he appointed Merafhe as Vice-President. Merafhe was approved as Vice-President by Parliament on the same day, receiving 48 out of 56 votes, with no votes against, two spoiled votes, and six abstentions; he was immediately sworn in. The same day, Khama explained to the BDP caucus that he did not intend for Merafhe to ultimately succeed him as President; he envisioned eventually replacing Merafhe with another Vice-President who would in turn succeed Khama in 2018. Merafhe was not given a ministerial portfolio as Vice-President, although it was suggested that he might be tasked with project implementation across ministries.

Merafhe was married and had five children.

Following the second round of the Zimbabwean presidential election in June 2008, Merafhe said that the election was flawed and that Zimbabwe should be barred from participation in regional talks. On 22 July 2009, he was appointed to the BDP Central Committee by President Khama; he was one of five individuals appointed to that body by Khama.

Merafhe retired on 31 July 2012 and Ponatshego Kedikilwe was sworn in to succeed him as Vice-President on 1 August. He died on the morning of 7 January 2015 at the age of 78 after years of health complications.

Gallery

Awards and honours 
Botswana highest honour dubbed Naledi ya Botswana in 2011.

References

External links
https://www.un.org/webcast/ga/61/pdfs/botswana-e.pdf

1936 births
2015 deaths
Vice-presidents of Botswana
Foreign Ministers of Botswana
Botswana generals
Members of the National Assembly (Botswana)
People from Serowe
Botswana diplomats
Government ministers of Botswana
Botswana Democratic Party politicians